The Groovenians is an American computer-animated pilot created by Kenny Scharf and produced by Cartoon Network Studios. It was aired on Cartoon Network's late night programming block Adult Swim on November 10, 2002, but was also re-aired on the network itself during the block "Cartoon Cartoon Fridays" on February 21, 2003. The pilot was panned by critics and audiences, resulting in the series not being picked up by the network.

Plot
The Groovenians follows an adolescent couple named Jet and Glindy from a planet named Jeepers. On Jeepers, society is uniform and artistic qualities are shunned. Jet and Glindy, however, are artists and performers who often perform on their front lawns. Their parents do not approve, and they tell Jet and Glindy that art is not everything in life. As Glindy talks to Jet about wanting to leave Jeepers, a boy named Nixon is dropped next door from a spaceship. He had been evicted from a planet called Groovenia, which he tells Jet and Glindy is a paradise for artists. He gives them his key before he is dragged into his house by his grandmother.

After being presented with options for their future, Jet and Glindy decide to leave Jeepers behind and go to Groovenia, however, Jet's father stops them. He, along with Jet's mother, dictates their future; Glindy is to work at an office job and Jet is to marry Glindy's sister. Glindy manages to stop the wedding, and the two, along with Jet's dog, Looki, are run out by the parents and Glindy's sister.

The three escape to the "jetport" where they board a jet to Groovenia. Upon the plane, they are greeted by the flight attendant who has a short sequence creating hype for the planet. Upon landing, Jet and Glindy meet a tree that proclaims in rhyme that a key is needed to gain entry to Groovenia, which was earlier given to them by Nixon. They insert the key into the tree's keyhole, and she takes them to their apartment. There they meet the former roommates of Nixon, Swirly, Lalasha, and Suavo, and introduce themselves. They proceed to spend the day partying, but as Glindy proclaims aloud if Groovenia could possibly get any better, they are attacked by a group of robots called "Normals", and their king, Norman. The Normals and King Norman force them to pay taxes, where Suavo tells Jet and Glindy the reason why Nixon was evicted. It turns out, Nixon didn't pay his taxes, and because of this, Jet and Glindy have to pay them for him. The two are attacked by King Norman, scaring Jet. This causes Glindy to become angry, and she expels Norman and the Normals with colored paint and disco music, and the pilot ends with King Norman swearing revenge as the main characters dance.

Voice cast

 Paul Reubens – Jet, the Bubbie
 Drena De Niro – Glindy
 Vincent Gallo – Nixon
 Dennis Hopper – King Norman, Jet's Dad
 Ann Magnuson – Zazzy, Lalasha, Jet's Mom
 Debi Mazar – Swirly, Yalda, Cuckoo Bird
 RuPaul – Champagne Courvoisier
 Floyd Peterson – Funbus Captain
 Jeff Bennett – Suavo

Development
The Groovenians became the first television pilot created by Kenny Scharf, a surrealist painter from Brooklyn, New York. The art, animation, and concepts were the result of his long work experience as part of painting pop culture in a science fictional setting; Scharf drew inspiration from Hanna-Barbera's animated sitcom The Jetsons.

The pilot was produced with CGI-animation via S4 Studios rather than being produced entirely by Cartoon Network Studios. Scharf wrote the story with Jordan Reichek, the director of the pilot for Invader Zim, who also held the roles of director, producer, and storyboard artist. The names for new wave music are chosen to the music's composition: three of The B-52's members (Kate Pierson, Fred Schneider, and Cindy Wilson) for the soundtrack, but Mark Mothersbaugh instead for the background, and finally Bob Casale from Devo with some musicians of Mutato Muzika (Crash Bandicoots first games), always for the background but additionally. After the pilot was rejected by Cartoon Network, Scharf tried to pitch it to MTV or VH1 but it never materialized.

Reception
The Groovenians never picked up as the full series due to the negative reviews received by critics and audiences. Despite this, it was nominated at 30th Annie Awards as "Best Animated Short Subject".

References

External links
 

Adult Swim pilots and specials
Cartoon Network Studios pilots and shorts
Television pilots not picked up as a series